Hickory Grove is a town in York County, South Carolina, United States. The population was 440 at the 2010 census.

Geography
Hickory Grove is located at  (34.983982, -81.415899).

Demographics

As of the census of 2000, there were 337 people, 115 households, and 93 families residing in the town. The population density was 261.0 people per square mile (100.9/km2). There were 129 housing units at an average density of 99.9 per square mile (38.6/km2). The racial makeup of the town was 69.44% White, 28.78% African American, 0.30% Asian, 0.59% from other races, and 0.89% from two or more races. Hispanic or Latino of any race were 2.37% of the population.

There were 115 households, out of which 40.0% had children under the age of 18 living with them, 62.6% were married couples living together, 13.9% had a female householder with no husband present, and 18.3% were non-families. 13.9% of all households were made up of individuals, and 8.7% had someone living alone who was 65 years of age or older. The average household size was 2.93 and the average family size was 3.28.

In the town, the population was spread out, with 27.3% under the age of 18, 11.0% from 18 to 24, 27.3% from 25 to 44, 23.1% from 45 to 64, and 11.3% who were 65 years of age or older. The median age was 36 years. For every 100 females, there were 104.2 males. For every 100 females age 18 and over, there were 100.8 males.

The median income for a household in the town was $44,000, and the median income for a family was $46,563. Males had a median income of $28,229 versus $20,500 for females. The per capita income for the town was $17,014. 11.6% of the population and 7.2% of families fall below the poverty line. Out of the total population, 16.7% of those under the age of 18 and 12.5% of those 65 and older were living below the poverty line.

Notable people
 Bobby Bolin, former Major League Baseball pitcher for the San Francisco Giants, Milwaukee Brewers, and Boston Red Sox
 Josh Davis, former NFL wide receiver for the Miami Dolphins, New Orleans Saints, Minnesota Vikings, and Carolina Panthers

References

Towns in South Carolina
Towns in York County, South Carolina